Thomas Johnson is an American former Negro league pitcher who played in the 1930s and 1940s.

Johnson made his Negro leagues debut in 1937 for the St. Louis Stars. He went on to play several seasons with the Chicago American Giants through 1942.

References

External links
 and Seamheads

Year of birth missing
Place of birth missing
Chicago American Giants players
St. Louis Stars (1937) players
Baseball pitchers